Hanns-Friedrich Kunz (born 21 February 1945) is a German choral conductor.

Life and career 
Born in Ochsenhausen, Kunz first studied music at the Staatliche Hochschule für Musik und Darstellende Kunst Stuttgart. He then moved to Freiburg where he studied singing from 1969 to 1973. During his studies he was a member of the Gächinger Kantorei and took choir-conducting lessons with Helmuth Rilling in Frankfurt.

He attended various master classes, with Dietrich Fischer-Dieskau and Erik Werba among others. In 1974 he won a prize in the category "Lied and Oratorio" at the ARD International Music Competition in Munich. In addition to his engagement as a concert singer at home and abroad, he was a lecturer at the music academies in Freiburg and Karlsruhe for many years. 

From 1975 to 1987 Kunz was conductor of the Figuralchor Offenburg. From 1987 to April 2006 he conducted the Bach Choir Tübingen. In 1992 Kunz was appointed artistic director of the Stuttgarter Hymnus-Chorknaben. He held this position until his retirement in March 2010.

In 2002 he was awarded the title Kirchenmusikdirektor (KMD, church music director) by the Landesbischof. In 2003 he received the Order of Merit of Baden-Württemberg. In March 2010 he was awarded the citizen medal by the mayor of the city of Stuttgart.

References

External links 
 
 
 
 Hanns-Friedrich Kunz (Bass, Conductor) Bach Cantatas Website

1945 births
Living people
People from Ochsenhausen
German choral conductors
Recipients of the Order of Merit of Baden-Württemberg
Kirchenmusikdirektor